Momona is a small town on the Taieri Plain in New Zealand's South Island.
Momona School was established in 1899 and closed in 2004. 
The Henley Co-operative Dairy Company, established in nearby Henley, moved their cheese factory here, and was closed in the 1980s.

Momona is the location of Dunedin International Airport. With the establishment of the airport, an extra township was built for families of airport staff, its three streets being named after RNZAF airmen who received the Victoria Cross: James Allen Ward, Lloyd Trigg, and Leonard Henry Trent.

The road was named after John Kirk, a nearby resident, who was the grandfather of the Rt. Hon. Norman Kirk, Prime Minister of New Zealand from 1972 to 1974.

Demographics

Momona had a population of 2,322 at the 2018 New Zealand census, an increase of 117 people (5.3%) since the 2013 census, and an increase of 192 people (9.0%) since the 2006 census. There were 897 households. There were 1,209 males and 1,113 females, giving a sex ratio of 1.09 males per female. The median age was 43.0 years (compared with 37.4 years nationally), with 498 people (21.4%) aged under 15 years, 330 (14.2%) aged 15 to 29, 1,161 (50.0%) aged 30 to 64, and 336 (14.5%) aged 65 or older.

Ethnicities were 96.3% European/Pākehā, 8.1% Māori, 0.1% Pacific peoples, 1.6% Asian, and 1.3% other ethnicities (totals add to more than 100% since people could identify with multiple ethnicities).

The proportion of people born overseas was 9.9%, compared with 27.1% nationally.

Although some people objected to giving their religion, 60.5% had no religion, 32.0% were Christian, 0.4% were Buddhist and 0.9% had other religions.

Of those at least 15 years old, 318 (17.4%) people had a bachelor or higher degree, and 378 (20.7%) people had no formal qualifications. The median income was $38,000, compared with $31,800 nationally. 345 people (18.9%) earned over $70,000 compared to 17.2% nationally. The employment status of those at least 15 was that 1,050 (57.6%) people were employed full-time, 318 (17.4%) were part-time, and 39 (2.1%) were unemployed.

References

Populated places in Otago
Extreme points of New Zealand